Main Building is a common name for a building on some university and college campuses serving as home to administrative offices, such as president or provost and may refer to:

Austria
Main building (University of Vienna)

Canada
Main Building (Statistics Canada)

Hong Kong
HSBC Main Building, Hong Kong, the headquarters of The Hongkong and Shanghai Banking Corporation

Iceland
University of Iceland Main Building

Philippines
Main Building (University of Santo Tomas)

Russia 
Ministry of Foreign Affairs of Russia main building, Moscow
Main building of Moscow State University

Sweden
Lund University Main Building

United Kingdom
UCL Main Building, at University College London
Ministry of Defence Main Building (United Kingdom), Whitehall, London

United States

Main Building, Arkansas Baptist College, Little Rock, Arkansas
Main Building (Torrance High School), at Torrance High School in Torrance, California
Main Building (University of Notre Dame), South Bend, Indiana
Main Building (University of Kentucky), at the University of Kentucky in Lexington, Kentucky
Xavier University Main Building, Convent and Library, New Orleans, Louisiana
Main Building, Concordia College, a National Register of Historic Places listing in Clay County, Minnesota
Camden Free Public Library Main Building, Camden, New Jersey
New Mexico Military Institute Summer Camp, Main Building, a National Register of Historic Places listing in Lincoln County, New Mexico
Low Memorial Library, Columbia University, New York, New York
Hudson River State Hospital, Main Building, Poughkeepsie, New York
Main Building (Vassar College), Poughkeepsie, New York
Main Building, Louisburg College, Louisburg, North Carolina, built by Albert Gamaliel Jones
North Carolina School for the Deaf: Main Building, Morganton, North Carolina, built by A.G. Bauer
Peace College Main Building, Raleigh, North Carolina
Main Building, Mitchell College, Statesville, North Carolina
Main Building School, Wilmington, Ohio
Main Building, U.S. Bureau of Mines, Pittsburgh, Pennsylvania
Lander College Old Main Building, Greenwood, South Carolina
All Saints School Main Building, Sioux Falls, South Dakota
Main Building (St. Edward's University), Austin, Texas
Main Building (University of Texas at Austin)
Main Building, Blinn College, a National Register of Historic Places listing in Washington County, Texas
Main Building (University of Houston–Downtown) or Merchants and Manufacturers Building, Houston, Texas
Old Main (Texas State University) or Main Building, Southwest Texas Normal School, San Marcos, Texas
Main Building of Dixie College, a National Register of Historic Places listing in Washington County, Utah
Southern Seminary Main Building, Buena Vista, Virginia
Main Building (Montgomery, West Virginia)
Mary Baldwin College, Main Building, Staunton, Virginia

See also
Administration Building (disambiguation)
List of Old Main buildings